Hesperevax sparsiflora is a species of flowering plant in the family Asteraceae known by the common name erect dwarf cudweed. It is native to California and Oregon, where it grows in several habitat types including sandy coastal areas and the serpentine soils of inland hills. This is a small woolly annual herb reaching maximum heights under 18 centimeters. It has oval to rounded or scoop-shaped leaves on short petioles which vary in morphology across varieties. Small flower heads appear between the leaves. They contain greenish or whitish disc florets.

There are two varieties:
Hesperevax sparsiflora. var. brevifolia (short-leaved evax) is an uncommon coastal variety with leaves generally under a centimeter long
Hesperevax sparsiflora var. sparsiflora is a longer-leaved variety which is more common but limited to California

External links
 Calflora: Hesperevax sparsiflora (Erect dwarf cudweed,  Erect evax, Few flowered evax)
Jepson Manual eFlora (TJM2) treatment
USDA Plants Profile for Hesperevax sparsiflora (erect dwarf-cudweed)
UC CalPhotos: Hesperevax sparsiflora var. brevifolia
UC CalPhotos: Hesperevax sparsiflora var. sparsiflora

Gnaphalieae
Flora of California
Flora of Oregon
Endemic flora of the United States
Natural history of the California chaparral and woodlands
Natural history of the California Coast Ranges
Taxa named by Asa Gray
Taxa named by Edward Lee Greene
Flora without expected TNC conservation status